The Actions of the Bluff were local operations in 1916 carried out in Flanders during the First World War by the German 4th Army and the British Second Army. The Bluff is a mound near St Eloi, south-east of Ypres in Belgium, created from a spoil heap during the digging of the Ypres–Comines Canal before the war. From 14 to 15 February and on 2 March 1916, the Germans and the British fought for control of the Bluff, the Germans capturing the mound and defeating counter-attacks only for the British to recapture it and a stretch of German front line, after pausing to prepare a set-piece attack.

The fighting at the Bluff was one of nine sudden attacks for local gains made by the Germans or the British between the appointment of Sir Douglas Haig as commander in chief of the British Expeditionary Force (BEF), and the beginning of the Battle of the Somme. The BEF was at a tactical disadvantage, on low boggy ground, easily observed from German positions. A retirement to more defensible ground was impossible but rather than conserving manpower and resources with a tacit truce, the British kept an active front and five of the German local attacks in the period were retaliation for three British set-piece attacks.

The Germans had better weapons and with a homogenous army, could transfer troops and equipment along the Western Front easier than the Franco–British. The German army still had many pre-war trained officers NCOs and soldiers; the British wartime volunteers gained experience in minor tactics but success usually came from firepower; in the underground war, the BEF tunnellers overtook the Germans in technological ability and ambition. Capturing a portion of the opposing front line proved possible but holding it depended on the opponent. When the Bluff was captured, the British retook it; at the Battle of Mont Sorrel Mt Sorrel and Tor Top were retaken by the Canadians and British gains at St Eloi and Vimy Ridge were lost to German attacks. Had the British occupied the front less densely, more training could have taken place and the wisdom of each policy was debated at the time and since.

Background

Ypres district

Ypres is overlooked by Kemmel Hill to the south-west and from the east by low hills running south-west to north-east with Wytschaete (Wijtschate), Hill 60 to the east of Verbrandenmolen, Hooge, Polygon Wood and Passchendaele (Passendale). The rises are slight apart from the vicinity of Zonnebeke, which has a gradient of  From Hooge and to the east, the slope is  near Hollebeke, it is  heights are subtle but have the character of a saucer lip around Ypres. Further south is the muddy valley of the Douve river, Ploegsteert Wood (Plugstreet to the British) and Hill 63. West of Messines Ridge is the parallel Wulverghem (Spanbroekmolen) Spur; the Oosttaverne Spur, also parallel, is to the east. The general aspect south of Ypres is of low ridges and dips, gradually flattening to the north into a featureless plain.

Possession of the higher ground to the south and east of Ypres gives ample scope for ground observation, enfilade fire and converging artillery bombardments. An occupier has the advantage of artillery deployments and the movement of reinforcements, supplies and stores being screened from view. The ridge had woods from Wytschaete to Zonnebeke, giving good cover, some being of notable size like Polygon Wood and those later named Battle Wood, Shrewsbury Forest and Sanctuary Wood. Roads in this area were usually unpaved, except for the main ones from Ypres, ribboned with occasional villages and houses. The lowland west of the ridge was a mixture of meadow and fields, with high hedgerows dotted with trees, cut by streams and ditches emptying into canals. The main road to Ypres from Poperinge to Vlamertinge is in a defile, easily observed from the ridge.

The Bluff

Spoil banks had been created during the digging of the Ypres–Comines Canal, connecting the Yser lowlands with the Lys river valley. After the First Battle of Ypres in 1914, the front line ran at a right angle across the canal, which was still full of water. The British front line on the north bank ran here, just east of the Bluff.

Mining

In the spring of 1915, there was constant underground fighting in the Ypres Salient at Hooge, Hill 60, Railway Wood, Sanctuary Wood, St Eloi and the Bluff, which required new drafts of British tunnellers for several months after the formation of the first eight Tunnelling companies of the Royal Engineers. In late December, the 27th  Division (General Graf von Pfeil und Klein-Ellguth) was transferred from the Argonne to Flanders to reform the XIII Württemberg Corps (General Theodor von Watter) with the 26th  Division and took over part of the line on 6 January 1916. The division found the defences in good repair and well drained, although mostly sandbag breastworks rather than trenches. There was a vulnerable spot at the south end of the line, where the Bluff overlooked the German defences. Previously a mine had been exploded under the Bluff but to no effect and the division began a greater mining effort. After the big mine explosion of  the British fortified the front lip of the crater and the 172nd Tunnelling Company was diverted from its mining at St Eloi to dig a defensive mine system to prevent the Germans trying again; waterlogging and the loose soil along the canal back caused the miners much difficulty.

Prelude

German offensive preparations

As part of the German plan for the Battle of Verdun (21 February – 18 December 1916), the German armies on the Western Front were ordered to divert attention from the 5th Army with line straightening operations and giving the impression that reinforcements had arrived. From 8 to 19 February, the 4th Army ( [Colonel General] Albrecht, Duke of Württemberg) in Flanders, conducted several operations around the Ypres Salient, with artillery bombardments and bombardments followed by attacks. On 12 February, the Germans attacked near Boesinghe (Boezinge) as the 20th (Light) Division was relieving the 14th (Light) Division and got into the front line, until driven back by a prompt counter-attack, the British suffering  The German attacked again during the evening and were repulsed; another attack on 19 February also got into the front line for a short time. On 14 February, after a bombardment and the springing of several small mines, German infantry attacked several times against the 24th Division at Hooge and either side of Sanctuary Wood. The XIII  Corps commander, Watter, had given orders for a methodical attack at the Bluff by Infantry Regiment 124 (IR 124), despite a judgement from General Berthold von Deimling, the previous corps commander, that the Bluff was easier to capture than to hold.

British defensive preparations

The purpose of the German diversionary operations was unknown to the Second Army (General Horace Smith-Dorrien). Reconnaissance flights by the new II Brigade Royal Flying Corps (RFC) were made more difficult by the bad winter weather but 6 Squadron managed to see enough to report that a German offensive was unlikely. The RFC concentrated on artillery-observation for the British heavy artillery and in February arranged a standard call "general artillery action" at which all aircraft stopped routine operations for artillery-observation and reconnaissance sorties. The V Corps (Lieutenant-General Herbert Plumer) front ran from south of St Eloi to Hooge and was held by the 17th (Northern) Division, 50th Division and the 24th Division. The only crossing of the canal was a plank bridge some distance back from New Year Trench and although the rule that a topographical feature going through a position should not be used as a unit boundary was followed, only a platoon of the 10th Battalion, Lancashire Fusiliers held the Bluff, the rest of the battalion being on the south bank. The 50th Brigade was in V Corps reserve which left only one battalion in reserve for the 17th (Northern) Division.

The 51st Brigade held a  front with three battalions and one in reserve, half kept ready for an immediate counter-attack if the Bluff was captured. On battalion was moving up to relieve one of the front battalions, its bombers (after complaints from the Grenadier Guards, hand grenade specialists had been renamed bombers, who had recently been issued with steel helmets) and Lewis gunners having arrived on 13 February. During the relief, the Bluff was the responsibility of another brigade and two battalions were mixed up; the brigade machine-gun companies, which had joined the division the day previous, were still behind the front line. On the morning of 14 February, the left flank of the 52nd Brigade at the canal and the fronts of the 51st Brigade and the rest of the V Corps front to the north, were subjected to several bombardments by German heavy artillery and after  the shelling of the 51st Brigade and the 24th Division front at Hooge increased. The platoon of the 10th Lancashire Fusiliers on the Bluff took cover in The Tunnel, formerly a German mine gallery from the Bluff to the canal. Trench mortar and howitzer fire, which was usual before an infantry attack led the defenders to request heavy artillery support.

Action

14–16 February

By  the British front parapet had been demolished and a mine detonation buried the party sheltering in The Tunnel, killing all but three men; two mines were blown on the left of the 10th Sherwood Foresters (10th Sherwood) on the left of the 51st Brigade. IR 124 attacked on a  front from the canal to a feature known as the Ravine, a stream parallel to the canal. Some German troops pressed on to the British support trenches but were repulsed. Parties of IR 124 also got into trenches and the Ravine on the left, held by the 8th South Staffordshire. The Germans were also quickly forced back but the two companies reserved for an instant counter-attack on the Bluff were delayed by a command mix up, the men went forward piecemeal and conducted an indecisive bombing fight with the Germans for the rest of the night.

By  IR 124 held the Bluff and the 51st Brigade line from the canal to the Ravine. During the afternoon the 52nd Brigade was relieved of responsibility for the north bank and two battalions of the 50th Brigade were sent forward for a counter-attack against the Bluff. Plumer gave the task to troops who knew the ground and on the night of  the 76th Brigade (Brigadier-General Ernest Pratt) of the 3rd Division, which had been resting out of the line, took over with attached artillery and engineers from the 51st Brigade and began to consolidate a new line. The ground had been smashed up by artillery-fire, was cut with derelict trenches and the Bluff was enclosed by the canal and a stream on the north side which made the ground swampy.

17 February – 1 March

The 76th Brigade planned to attack against the width of the lost trenches at dusk, to have the maximum time for consolidation, preferably on 29 February. Both sides kept up the bombardment and German casualties were so severe that IR 124 was relieved from 20 to 22 February by Grenadier Regiment 123 (GR 123), which found that the German defences had been destroyed and had to take post in scraps of trench and shell-holes, living up to the waist in water. Over the nights of   the 76th Brigade was relieved by the 52nd Brigade to rest for the attack and its four battalions were equipped with steel helmets, along with two battalions of the 51st Brigade attached for the operation. The force practised on a replica of the German positions copied from aerial photographs, as the 52nd Brigade laboured on jumping-off trenches in the remnants of a sheltered wood, communication trenches, burying telephone cables and carrying ammunition and stores.

German artillery bombardments slowed the work; stormy weather and then snowfalls from 27 February outlined the new trenches and on 28 February, the attack was put back to 2 March, after the cold and snow ended with a thaw which turned the ground into slush; the following days were cold and wet with sleet and snow. The attackers could not wait for 15 to 18 hours but a dusk attack meant moving up the night before. Pratt wanted a long preparatory bombardment and Brigadier-General Herbert Uniacke, the corps artillery commander, proposed a surprise attack with no preliminary artillery-fire. The commanders agreed a plan to bombard the German defences until the original zero hour at dusk, cease fire, move up the attack force overnight and attack after a 90-minute dawn bombardment. No date set because of the weather and incomplete artillery registration but the attack would occur on the second morning after a day with good enough weather to finish registering the guns. As the front line curved eastwards north of the 17th (Northern) Division, four heavy guns were dug in and camouflaged on Observatory Ridge, to fire along the Germans trenches during the attack. After a cessation of the bombardment, Pratt was to decide at  if there was to be a 20-minute bombardment before the attack, depending on the German response.

The British attack was to capture more than had been lost, by digging a new line across a feature known as the Bean to protect a re-entrant in the old front line. The right-hand battalion was to retake New Year Trench, the Bluff and Loop Trench, the central and left-hand battalions to attack further north. Each battalion had attached sections of the 56th and East Riding companies RE and tunnelling parties. A battalion was in support of the right-flank battalion and another support battalion was to be available to all three, with two companies behind the centre battalion and a battalion in reserve. On the far right of the attack a raiding party was to demolish any German mine shafts found along the canal bank. Nine -inch, ten 2-inch,  four 3-inch Stokes mortars and three 4-inch Stokes mortars were placed in groups on either side of the canal; the bombardment began on 1 March and the Stokes mortars were able to hit areas that the howitzers could not reach. Observation revealed that nearly all the German defences on the Bluff had been destroyed but trenches to the north had been improved and re-wired.

2 March

The waves of infantry easily walked over the remaining wire unopposed. The German sentries at the Bluff were found under cover, expecting the artillery salvo after the usual two-minute pause and the rest of the garrison was in dug-outs in the western face of the large crater. To the north, the attackers overran the objective on the Bean, which they did not recognise, because the trenches had been obliterated. Parties which ventured further forward suffered many casualties and the survivors were pulled back to the objective where consolidation began. On the left flank the British troops were reinforced and by  had captured the machine-gun nest. The attackers took  although  them were only taken from the dug-outs at the Bluff after resisting into the evening.

The raiders blew in the gallery in no man's land that led to the Bluff but those from the 172nd Tunnelling Company were killed by machine-gun fire. The German artillery reply began at  but intense fire did not begin until  by when the British had emptied their front line and made rapid progress in consolidation. The German artillery continued a high rate of fire until  and severely damaged the old and new front lines, which took much work to repair. One of the trenches was named International Trench after dead from three armies were discovered. GR 123 had been exhausted by the 36-hour preparatory bombardment, which destroyed the German positions. In the evening bombers from GR 123 and parties from IR 124 and IR 127 counter-attacked. The British bombers, with plenty of Mills grenades and supported by many machine-guns were able to repulse the Germans. (Each attacker had carried two grenades and  had been dumped close by.)

Aftermath

Analysis

The fighting at the Bluff was one of nine sudden attacks for local gains made by the Germans and the British between the appointment of Sir Douglas Haig as commander in chief of the BEF and the beginning of the  Battle of the Somme. After the Second Battle of Ypres (22 April – 25 May 1915) and the Battle of Loos (25 September – 13 October) and the extension of the British front in early 1916, the BEF was at a tactical disadvantage against the German army, on wetter ground, easily observed from German positions. When the BEF took over more of the Western Front from the French, it was to be held lightly with outposts, while a better line was surveyed further back. The survey revealed that all of the French gains of 1915 would have to be abandoned, a proposal that the French rejected out of hand. For political reasons, giving up ground around Ypres in Belgium was also unacceptable, only an advance could be contemplated to improve the positions of the BEF. Since the French and British anticipated early advances in 1916, there seemed little point in working on defences, when the Germans were building more elaborate defences, except at Verdun. Rather than continue the informal truces that had developed between French and German trench garrisons, the British kept an active front and five of the German local attacks in the period were retaliation for three British set-piece attacks.

In early 1916, the Germans had an advantage in trench warfare equipment, being equipped with more and better hand grenades, rifle grenades and trench mortars. It was easier for the Germans to transfer troops, artillery and ammunition along the Western Front than the Franco-British, who had incompatible weapons and ammunition. A substantial cadre of German pre-war trained officers NCOs and soldiers remained; the British wartime volunteers gained experience in minor tactics but success usually came from machine-guns and the accuracy and quantity of artillery support, not individual skill and bravery. In the underground war, the BEF tunnellers overtook their German counterparts in technological ability and ambition. With sufficient artillery, the capture of a small part of the opponents' line was possible but holding it depended on the response of the opponent. When the Bluff was captured, the British retaliated and retook it and Mount Sorrel and Tor Top were retaken by Canadian troops; when the British took ground at St Eloi and Vimy Ridge, the Germans took it back. The constant local fighting was costly but enabled the mass of inexperienced British troops to gain experience, yet had the front been less densely occupied, more troops could have trained and the wisdom of each school of thought was debated at the time and ever since.

Casualties

There were  casualties on 2 March, GR 123 suffering casualties of  killed,  and

Subsequent operations

The Germans dug long galleries beneath the Bluff and on 25 July the 1st Company, 24th Pioneers blew a mine under the ridge. The 1st Canadian Tunnelling Company had given warning of the German attempt and the 7th Canadian Battalion occupied the crater before the German infantry arrived. Mining and tunnel warfare continued at the Bluff by tunnelling companies of the Royal Engineers. After a prisoner drew a map of the German mine workings, the British dug a deep system under the galleries beyond the German lines. On 11 December, several big camouflets were sprung and the German mine galleries were captured, making it impossible for German tunnellers to retaliate and the area was declared safe. On 7 June 1917, the Germans were driven from the area during the Battle of Messines Ridge. The Germans re-took the Bluff during the Spring Offensive of 1918 and it changed hands for the last time on 28 September 1918, after an attack by the 14th (Light) Division.

Commemoration

The wooded ridge is now a provincial nature reserve and picnic area, Provinciaal Domein Palingbeek. There are three Commonwealth War Graves Commission (CWGC) war cemeteries in the area
 1st DCLI Cemetery, The Bluff
 Hedge Row Trench Cemetery
 Woods Cemetery

Notes

Footnotes

References

Books
 
 
 
 
 
 
 

Websites

Further reading
Books
 
 

Websites

External links

 Doings of the 172nd Tunnelling Company

History of Ypres
Tunnel warfare in World War I
1916 in Belgium
Explosions in 1916
Bluff
Bluff
Bluff
Bluff
February 1916 events
March 1916 events